Buttsole is a hamlet within the civil parish of Eastry, south-west of Sandwich in Kent, England. It is a cluster of houses along Lower Street, south of the centre of Eastry.

Hamlets in Kent